Hayes Bridge is a historic wooden covered bridge in West Buffalo Township, Union County, Pennsylvania. It crosses the west or south branch of Buffalo Creek.

It was listed on the National Register of Historic Places in 1980.

References

Covered bridges on the National Register of Historic Places in Pennsylvania
Covered bridges in Union County, Pennsylvania
Bridges completed in 1882
Wooden bridges in Pennsylvania
Bridges in Union County, Pennsylvania
National Register of Historic Places in Union County, Pennsylvania
Road bridges on the National Register of Historic Places in Pennsylvania
King post truss bridges in the United States